Bhuwan Chandra Kapri is an Indian politician and a member of Indian National Congress, who represents Khatima constituency. On 10 April 2022, Bhuwan Chandra Kapri was elected as the Deputy Leader of Congress Legislative Party (CLP) in the Uttarakhand Legislative Assembly.

Kapri won the 2022 Uttarakhand Legislative Assembly election from Khatima constituency, with a margin of 6579 votes against the incumbent Chief Minister of Uttarakhand, Pushkar Singh Dhami. He is also a former Working President of Uttarakhand Pradesh Congress Committee.

Bhuwan Kapri lost the 2017 Uttarakhand Legislative Assembly Election and finished as runner up.

Kapri has been associated with the Indian National Congress and National Students' Union of India for a long time. He started his political career from Hemwati Nandan Bahuguna Govt PG College, Khatima where he became President of the Students’ Union. Previously he also served as the Chairman of Khatima Mandi Council.

References

Indian National Congress politicians from Uttarakhand
Uttarakhand MLAs 2022–2027
Year of birth missing (living people)
Living people